Peter Barsocchini is an American screenwriter, author, former journalist, and television producer best known for his scripts for the High School Musical series.

Early life and education 
Barsocchini began his professional writing career while attending high school in the San Francisco Bay Area, writing more than 300 columns about popular music for The San Mateo Times. He also worked as a freelance reporter for the Associated Press and the San Francisco Examiner, and contributed reviews to the Associated Press and Rolling Stone. Barsocchini graduated from the University of California, Santa Cruz with a degree in creative writing.

Career 
As a young journalist, he spent weeks backstage at Fillmore West, covering Janis Joplin, Jimi Hendrix, Eric Clapton, The Grateful Dead, the Kinks, and Elton John. After graduating from college, Barsocchini was hired by the Merv Griffin Company as an interviewer for the Merv Griffin Show. In 1979, Barsocchini was named producer, a position he held for seven years. He won an Emmy Award twice as producer, the youngest talk-show producer ever to receive the award. He also was the ghostwriter for Griffin's autobiography which became a national bestseller, and was followed by a collection of interviews, "From Where I Sit," published in 1981. His first novel "Ghost" was published to laudatory reviews in the late 1980s with the screen rights being purchased by Paramount Pictures, beginning the transition to the film business. His screenplay Drop Zone was produced by Paramount and starred Wesley Snipes. He also wrote novelization of Mission Impossible.

High School Musical 
In 2004, Peter Barsocchini wrote the first draft of a script for the Disney Channel Original Movie, High School Musical for his preteen daughter Gabriella and many of her friends for whom he also named characters. He recalled knowing the film could be a success when the first draft was given a green light from Disney. The television film became a phenomenon that spawned billions in revenue and two sequels. The first sequel, High School Musical 2, shattered expectations and records becoming the highest rated cable broadcast in history with well over seventeen million viewers. High School Musical 3: Senior Year was released in theaters worldwide and had the biggest opening weekend gross for any movie musical in history. The author has already been approached to write yet another installment of the series revolving around characters established in the third film. However, there is no official word to whether the film will happen.

Filmography (writer) 

Dance Fever (1986)
Drop Zone (1994)
Shadow-Ops (1995)
High School Musical (2006)
High School Musical 2 (2007)
High School Musical 3: Senior Year (2008)
Rock and Roll Forever (2008)
The Passion (2016)
Ping Pong Rabbit (2019)
Vivo (2021)

Filmography (producer) 

Shadow-Ops (1995)The Merv Griffin Show''

References

External links 

Living people
American male screenwriters
Television producers from California
University of California, Santa Cruz alumni
Writers from San Francisco
Screenwriters from California
Year of birth missing (living people)
Junípero Serra High School (San Mateo, California) alumni